In the calculus of variations, a field of mathematical analysis, the functional derivative (or variational derivative) relates a change in a functional (a functional in this sense is a function that acts on functions) to a change in a function on which the functional depends.

In the calculus of variations, functionals are usually expressed in terms of an integral of functions, their arguments, and their derivatives.

For example, consider the functional

where .

where the variation in the derivative,  was rewritten as the derivative of the variation , and integration by parts was used.

Definition
In this section, the functional derivative is defined. Then the functional differential is defined in terms of the functional derivative.

Functional derivative
Given a manifold  representing (continuous/smooth) functions  (with certain boundary conditions etc.), and a functional  defined as

where  is an arbitrary function.

In other words,

is a linear functional, so one may apply the Riesz–Markov–Kakutani representation theorem to represent this functional as integration against some measure.
Then  is defined to be the Radon–Nikodym derivative of this measure.

Then analogous to vector calculus, the inner product with the gradient gives the directional derivative.

Functional differential

where  are independent variables.
Comparing the last two equations, the functional derivative  has a role similar to that of the partial derivative , where the variable of integration  is like a continuous version of the summation index .

Properties
 Linearity:  where  are constants.
 Product rule: 
 Chain rules:
If  is a functional and  another functional, then 
If  is an ordinary differentiable function (local functional) , then this reduces to

Determining functional derivatives
A formula to determine functional derivatives for a common class of functionals can be written as the integral of a function and its derivatives. This is a generalization of the Euler–Lagrange equation: indeed, the functional derivative was introduced in physics within the derivation of the Lagrange equation of the second kind from the principle of least action in Lagrangian mechanics (18th century). The first three examples below are taken from density functional theory (20th century), the fourth from statistical mechanics (19th century).

Formula
Given a functional

and a function  that vanishes on the boundary of the region of integration, from a previous section Definition,

The second line is obtained using the total derivative, where  is a derivative of a scalar with respect to a vector.

The third line was obtained by use of a product rule for divergence. The fourth line was obtained using the divergence theorem and the condition that  on the boundary of the region of integration. Since  is also an arbitrary function, applying the fundamental lemma of calculus of variations to the last line, the functional derivative is

For other functional forms, the definition of the functional derivative can be used as the starting point for its determination. (See the example Coulomb potential energy functional.)

The above equation for the functional derivative can be generalized to the case that includes higher dimensions and higher order derivatives. The functional would be,

An analogous application of the definition of the functional derivative yields

and the tensor scalar product is,

Examples

Thomas–Fermi kinetic energy functional
The Thomas–Fermi model of 1927 used a kinetic energy functional for a noninteracting uniform electron gas in a first attempt of density-functional theory of electronic structure:

Coulomb potential energy functional
For the electron-nucleus potential, Thomas and Fermi employed the Coulomb potential energy functional

Applying the definition of functional derivative,

So,

For the classical part of the electron-electron interaction, Thomas and Fermi employed the Coulomb potential energy functional

From the definition of the functional derivative,

Therefore,

and the functional derivative of the electron-electron coulomb potential energy functional [ρ] is,

The second functional derivative is

Weizsäcker kinetic energy functional
In 1935 von Weizsäcker proposed to add a gradient correction to the Thomas-Fermi kinetic energy functional to make it better suit a molecular electron cloud:

where

Using a previously derived formula for the functional derivative,

and the result is,

Entropy
The entropy of a discrete random variable is a functional of the probability mass function.

Thus,

Thus,

Exponential 

Let

Using the delta function as a test function,

Thus,

This is particularly useful in calculating the correlation functions from the partition function in quantum field theory.

Functional derivative of a function
A function can be written in the form of an integral like a functional. For example,

Since the integrand does not depend on derivatives of ρ, the functional derivative of ρ is,

Functional derivative of iterated function
The functional derivative of the iterated function  is given by:

and

In general:

Putting in  gives:

Using the delta function as a test function
In physics, it is common to use the Dirac delta function  in place of a generic test function , for yielding the functional derivative at the point  (this is a point of the whole functional derivative as a partial derivative is a component of the gradient):

The formula is however not mathematically rigorous, since  is usually not even defined.

The definition given in a previous section is based on a relationship that holds for all test functions , so one might think that it should hold also when  is chosen to be a specific function such as the delta function. However, the latter is not a valid test function (it is not even a proper function).

In the definition, the functional derivative describes how the functional  changes as a result of a small change in the entire function . Employing the particular form of the perturbation given by the delta function has the meaning that  is varied only in the point .

Notes

Footnotes

References
.
.
.
.
.

External links

 

Calculus of variations
Differential calculus
Differential operators
Topological vector spaces
Variational analysis